Tenet: Original Motion Picture Soundtrack is the soundtrack album to the 2020 film of the same name written and directed by Christopher Nolan, released under WaterTower Music on September 2, 2020. Ludwig Göransson created and composed the score for the film, marking his first collaboration with Nolan. Nolan had originally wanted frequent collaborator Hans Zimmer to compose the score but Zimmer had to decline due to his commitments to Dune, which was also produced by Warner Bros. Pictures. On February 3, 2021, the score was nominated for Golden Globe Award for Best Original Score for the 78th Golden Globe Awards.

Production
Ludwig Göransson composed the score after Nolan's frequent collaborator Hans Zimmer had committed himself to the 2021 film Dune, which Zimmer wanted to do since the 1980s. During the COVID-19 pandemic, Göransson recorded musicians at their homes. 

During an interview in a podcast with Kenny Holmes and Robert Kraft, Göransson stated in early August 2020 that he finished creating the score weeks before August, and praised Nolan for choosing him, stating; "I finished my part, working on it a couple of weeks ago. I feel so fortunate in my career to work with like these geniuses and I feel like that's why it feels so easy for me". When asked if Nolan came over to his studio and told him how he wanted "things to sound", Göransson said; "Absolutely. He can talk so much about music, you know". Göransson also stated he began working on Tenets score three or four months before filming even commenced.

Travis Scott's involvement in the soundtrack was a last-minute decision when director Christopher Nolan told Göransson he decided to add an end title track to the credit. According to Göransson, Travis Scott was sent the track "Trucks in Place" and "The Plan" was written from the beat of the former after having heard the track. Göransson added that a snippet of Scott's voice from "The Plan" was placed on top of The Protagonist's theme, which is audible in several tracks within the score, with him stating; "It ["The Plan"] was actually so good that me & Chris, we took a snippet of Travis' voice and placed it out on top of The Protagonist's theme throughout the movie. And that was kind of the last, missing piece of the puzzle that we just did."

Track listing

Notes
 All track titles are stylized in all caps.

References

2020 soundtrack albums
2020s film soundtrack albums
Action film soundtracks
Ludwig Göransson soundtracks
Science fiction film soundtracks
WaterTower Music soundtracks